Erich Jarvis is an American professor at Rockefeller University. He leads a team of researchers who study the neurobiology of vocal learning, a critical behavioral substrate for spoken language. The animal models he studies include songbirds, parrots, and hummingbirds. Like humans, these bird groups have the ability to learn new sounds and pass on their vocal repertoires culturally, from one generation to the next. Jarvis focuses on the molecular pathways involved in the perception and production of learned vocalizations, and the development of brain circuits for vocal learning. 

In 2002, the National Science Foundation awarded Jarvis its highest honor for a young researcher, the Alan T. Waterman Award. In 2005 he was awarded the National Institutes of Health Director's Pioneer Award providing funding for five years to researchers pursuing innovative approaches to biomedical research. In 2008 Dr. Jarvis was selected to the prestigious position of Investigator for the Howard Hughes Medical Institute.

Life and career 
Erich Jarvis was born in Harlem, New York. Jarvis was one of four children of Sasha McCall, a gospel singer, and James Jarvis, a musician and amateur scientist. Since the age of six, he was primarily raised by his mother, after his parents divorced in 1970. Jarvis credits his family, and primarily his father's mind and enthusiasm for science, for his interest in biology. His father suffered from drug-induced schizophrenia and was homeless, living in various parks, prior to becoming the victim of a fatal shooting in 1989. Jarvis attended the High School for the Performing Arts in Manhattan, where he studied ballet. Jarvis turned down an Alvin Ailey American Dance theater audition to study at Hunter College, where he received a B.A. in Biology and Mathematics in 1988. During his undergraduate years at Hunter, he had six scientific publications. He continued his education at Rockefeller University, earning a Ph.D. in Animal Behavior and Molecular Neurobehavior under Dr. Fernando Nottebohm in 1995. He continued his postdoctoral education at Rockefeller University until 1998.

Jarvis became an assistant and an adjunct assistant professor at Rockefeller University from 1995 to 2002. He then was an associate professor of neurobiology at Duke University Medical Center until December 2016, when he returned to Rockefeller University, where he is professor and head of the Laboratory of Neurogenetics of Language.

The focus of Jarvis' research is the vocal learning capabilities in birds and how they learn to mimic sounds. His research with songbirds is being used to show the evolution of human language capacity and speech disorders. To accomplish this objective, Dr. Jarvis takes an integrative approach to research, combining behavioral, anatomical, electrophysiological, molecular biological, and genomic techniques. The discoveries of Dr. Jarvis and his collaborators include the first findings of natural behaviorally regulated gene expression in the avian brain, social context dependent gene regulation, convergent vocal learning systems across distantly related animal groups, the FOXP2 gene in vocal learning birds, and the finding that vocal learning systems may have evolved out of ancient motor learning systems. 

His cutting edge research identifies the neurological basis of birdsong at the tissue, cellular and genetic levels. A recent project seeks to transform birds without songs such as pigeons into  birds that sing by genetic neuro-engineering, e.g. injecting new genes into the forebrain. If successful, this could have implications for treating patients with loss of speech after stroke.

Awards and honors 
 1986	First Place Award for Excellence in Biomedical Research, NIH-MBRS Annual Symposium
1988	MARC-NIGMS Pre-doctoral National Research Service Award 
1988	FORD Foundation Pre-Doctoral Fellowship
 2000	Esther & Joseph Klingenstein Award in Neuroscience
 2000	Whitehall Foundation Award in Neuroscience
 2000	David and Lucille Packard Foundation Award
 2001	Duke University Provost Bioinformatic Award
 2002	Duke University Provost Computational Biology Award
 2002	Hall of Fame: Alumni Association of Hunter College
 2002	Human Frontiers in Science Program Young Investigators Award
 2002	NSF Alan T. Waterman Award. NSF's highest award for young investigators given annually to one scientist or engineer who under the age of 35 made a significant discovery/impact in science. Awarded for molecular approach and findings to map brain areas involved in behavior.
 2003	The 2003 Distinguished Alumni Award of the City University of New York.
 2005	Dominion Award: Strong Men and Women of Excellence: African American Leaders. Prior awardees include Arthur Ashe, Maya Angelou, Oprah Winfrey, and Michael Jordan.
 2005	NIH Director's Pioneer Award
 2006	Discover magazine top 100 science discoveries of 2005; avian brain nomenclature listed at #51
 2006	Diverse magazine's top 10 emerging scholars of 2006
 2006	Popular Science Magazine: Named in Fifth Annual Brilliant Ten
 2008	HHM Investigator Award
2014	Summit Award with NSF and NINDS from the American Society of Association Executives for successes of the Society for Neuroscience’s Scholars Program
 2015	Ernest Everett Just Award, American Society for Cell Biology

References

External links 
 Jarvis Lab
 National Academies of Science Evolution and Medicine 2009
 NOVA Science Now
 People Magazine
Erich Jarvis's Talk: "Song and Dance"

African-American scientists
American neuroscientists
Hunter College alumni
Rockefeller University alumni
Duke University faculty
Living people
Howard Hughes Medical Investigators
1965 births